Radiovittaria is a genus of ferns in the subfamily Vittarioideae of the family Pteridaceae. Species are native to southeast Mexico and northern Southern America.

Species
, the Checklist of Ferns and Lycophytes of the World recognized the following species:
Radiovittaria gardneriana (Fée) E.H.Crane
Radiovittaria latifolia (Benedict) E.H.Crane
Radiovittaria minima (Baker) E.H.Crane
Radiovittaria moritziana (Mett.) E.H.Crane
Radiovittaria remota (Fée) E.H.Crane
Radiovittaria ruiziana (Fée) E.H.Crane
Radiovittaria stipitata (Kunze) E.H.Crane

References

Pteridaceae
Fern genera